Tiffany "Tiffani" Jane Wood (born 8 November 1977), briefly known as Tiffani Cummins, is an Australian singer and songwriter, who is a former member of female pop group Bardot. Wood later established an independent solo career, and released her debut solo album Bite Your Tongue in 2006.

Early life

Wood was born on 8 November 1977 in Newcastle, New South Wales. She developed an interest in performing from a young age, studied jazz dancing and eventually assisted younger students.

At age 12, Wood's mother Judy encouraged her to take up singing by joining the Young Talent Time talent school. Her teachers noticed her singing talent and at age 15, placed her into a show troupe "The Young Stars" which performed at various venues around New South Wales. During this three-year stint, Wood had her first experience of recording for an album and performing solo in front of large crowds, her biggest being the opening of the Sydney Harbour Tunnel where she performed in front of over 20,000 people.

During her schooling years, she entered and won numerous talent quests and played the lead vocal role in her 1994 school musical Murder in the Music Hall. She completed her Higher School Certificate in 1995, and the age of 18, became the lead singer of a cover band "Quiver". They performed a wide range of songs including Tracy Chapman, Pearl Jam, Shania Twain, Alanis Morissette, and Wood recorded original songs with the band.

She then moved to Sydney, where she studied at the Australian Institute of Music, and joined another cover band "The Anthill Mob".

Big break

In late 1999, at the age of 22, Wood auditioned for the first Australian series of Popstars, a reality television show which aimed to produce a new girl group. After selections for the group were finalised by the judges, she just missed out. However, after original member Chantelle Barry was forced out of the group in controversial circumstances, Wood was selected to replace her as the fifth member of the band, now known as Bardot.

Popstars was one of the most popular, highest-rating television programs in Australia of 2000 and with the group's overwhelming exposure, Bardot's debut single "Poison" and self-titled debut album both entered at number one on the Australian ARIA charts, achieving multi-platinum sales. Further singles "I Should've Never Let You Go" and "These Days" continued the group's successful assault on the Australian charts and in August, Bardot embarked on its first national tour. Wood performed with her bandmates at the ARIA Music Awards of 2001 for which they were nominated in three categories. Promotional tours were made in numerous countries including Singapore, Taiwan, New Zealand, India and the United Kingdom.

In 2001, Bardot returned to the spotlight with "ASAP", the first single from their second album. "ASAP" went Top 5 as did the following single "I Need Somebody". In November, Bardot released its second album Play It Like That, which achieved gold status upon release and performed before 90,000 music lovers at the Rumba festivals.

In early 2002, they embarked on their second national tour and released their final single "Love Will Find a Way", before deciding to "call it a day" in April of that year. At the girl's final public concert, performed live at Channel [V], Wood broke into tears, sad at the realisation that it was all coming to an end. Later in interviews, she stated that she and former bandmate Belinda Chapple were the two members keen to continue as a group.

Solo career
Like former Bardot bandmate Sophie Monk, Wood signed a solo recording contract with Warner Music and changed her name from Tiffany Wood to Tiffani Wood in order to avoid confusion with the 1980s American popstar Tiffany. The debut single, "What R U Waiting 4" re-introduced Wood back into the music scene, marketed as an organic, light pop-rock singer (similar to the likes of Michelle Branch, Alanis Morissette etc.). The track debuted at number 27 on the ARIA singles chart on 22 March 2004 and was one of the most-played songs on Australian radio in that month.

Behind the scenes, however, tensions between Wood and Warner Music grew. Wood insisted that the second single be a self-penned track but Warner Music already planned on releasing someone else's song as the next single. After failing to reach a compromise, Wood made the decision to leave behind her recording contract for the option of artistic freedom and ultimate career control.

In 2005, after leaving Warner Music, Wood decided to release her material independently and established her own record label Mudhoney Records. The first single "Devil in Your Soul" was released on 18 July and showcased a harder, fast-paced rock sound with electrical guitars, strong drum beats and a saucy vocal performance by Wood. The tongue-in-cheek lyrics, written by Wood and Richie Goncalves (who produced the song) took a stab at the music industry and how major record labels take advantage of their younger artists in order to make them 'marketable'. The single debuted at number 13 on the Association of Independent Records Labels (AIR) chart and spent numerous weeks in the Top 20.

In April 2006, Wood released her second independent single "Spin the Bottle" with a number of promotional commitments including a performance on the Seven Network's top-rating breakfast television program Sunrise. The song also featured in promotions for long-time Australian soap Neighbours in the lead up to the 2006 TV Week Logie Awards. The single was a success on the AIR charts, debuting in Top 5 and eventually peaking at number 2.

Wood has established a strong reputation for her live performances, headlining shows at nightclubs and numerous events across the country. In 2006, she put together a burlesque-styled show, drawing inspiration from the 1940s and Dita Von Teese for her latest look and style of performance. In July 2006, Wood appeared in a nude photoshoot for nude-art magazine Black+White

In September 2006, she released an up-beat cover of the Divinyls 1990 number one hit "I Touch Myself", receiving generally positive reviews. The single peaked at number 5 on the ARIA charts and was performed on the ARL Footy Show.

Her debut solo album Bite Your Tongue was released in October 2006 and features a collection of self-penned rock-pop songs touching on issues such as body image, falling asleep behind the wheel and the entertainment industry. Respected music critic Cameron Adams gave the album three stars, crediting Wood for her "powerful voice" and describing the record as "sassy".

In 2007, Tiffani Wood appeared in the stage musical Las Vegas Confidential – The Musical. In 2009 she reunited with Bardot bandmate Katie Underwood in the stage show Valentino.

In April 2020, to commemorate the 20th anniversary of the release of Bardot's debut single "Poison", Wood, Chapple and Underwood reunited remotely online to perform the song.

Personal life

In December 2005, Wood publicly announced her engagement to UK born bouncer Neil Cummins, and the couple married on 28 January 2007. Photos from their wedding featured in OK! magazine. She gave birth to their first child, daughter Lillian Adel, on 18 April 2007. The couple have since separated and were divorced in May 2009.

Discography

Albums

Singles

References

External links

 Tiffani Wood at MySpace

1977 births
Living people
People from Newcastle, New South Wales
Bardot (Australian band) members
Australian singer-songwriters
Australian Institute of Music alumni
Wood, Tiffani
21st-century Australian singers
21st-century Australian women singers
Australian women singer-songwriters